Campbell Township is an inactive township in Polk County, in the U.S. state of Missouri.

Campbell Township was erected in 1885, taking its name from Glaves Campbell, a local war veteran.

References

Townships in Missouri
Townships in Polk County, Missouri